Bogʻot District (Боғот тумани, باغات تۇمەنى) or Bagat District is a district of Xorazm Region in Uzbekistan. The capital lies at the town Bogʻot. The district consists of 5 urban-type settlements (Bogʻot, Madaniyat, Nurafshon, Oltinqum, Uzumzor, Yangiqadam) and 10 rural communities.

References

Xorazm Region
Districts of Uzbekistan